Westville High School may refer to:
Westville High School (Illinois)
Westville High School (Indiana)